Sierra Railway No. 3, often called the "Movie Star locomotive", is a 19th-century steam locomotive owned by the State of California and preserved at Railtown 1897 State Historic Park in Jamestown, California. Former Transportation History curator at the Smithsonian Institution William L. Withhuhn described the locomotive's historical and cultural significance:
Sierra Railway No. 3 has appeared in more motion pictures, documentaries, and television productions than any other locomotive. It is undisputedly the image of the archetypal steam locomotive that propelled the USA from the 19th century into the 20th.
Built in 1891, the locomotive returned to operation in July 2010 after a fourteen-year absence from service and a three-year-long overhaul, requiring the replacement of its original boiler.

History

No. 3 is a 4-6-0 ten-wheeler built by the Rogers Locomotive and Machine Works of Paterson, New Jersey. Construction of the locomotive was completed on March 26, 1891, and was given Rogers construction number 4493. It has  cylinders,  driving wheels and weighs  in working order.  It was built for the Prescott & Arizona Central Railway (P&AC) as their locomotive #3 and named W.N. Kelley after the company's treasurer.

The P&AC went bankrupt in 1893 and its chief promoter, Thomas S. Bullock, relocated much of its equipment and hardware to California, including the No. 3. He then entered into a partnership with Prince André Poniatowski and William H. Crocker, and together in 1897 they incorporated the Sierra Railway Company of California to connect Oakdale, California with the mining and timber producing regions of Tuolumne County and Calaveras County.

The locomotive became Sierra No. 3 (dropping the W. N. Kelley name) and played a key role in the construction of the railroad to Jamestown, California in 1897, Sonora, California in 1899 and Tuolumne, California in 1900.  It was the primary locomotive pulling freight trains on the railroad until 1906, when the Sierra Railway purchased a new Baldwin Locomotive Works 2-8-0 locomotive.  It played a significant role in passenger and freight hauling operations in the Sierra foothills during the early development of Tuolumne County.

Originally built as a coal-fired locomotive, Sierra No. 3 was converted to burn oil sometime between 1900 and 1902.

Sierra No. 3 was involved in several wrecks.  In February 1898, a switch mishap killed conductor William G. Bailey. In September 1899, its tender derailed while backing up on a trestle, causing it to collapse.  The locomotive turned on its side in 1918 just above Sonora, destroying its original wooden cab, which was replaced with a new Southern Pacific steel cab in February, 1919.  Two years later, Sierra No. 3 made her first known Hollywood film appearance, in a silent film The Terror starring Tom Mix.

During the Great Depression, the original Sierra Railway Company of California went into bankruptcy, and was reorganized as the Sierra Railroad Company in 1937.  Sierra No. 3 was taken out of service in 1932, and parked on a siding in the Jamestown yard for 15 years.  It managed to avoid being scrapped during World War II, and again received attention from Hollywood in 1945, when David O. Selznick, the producer of Duel in the Sun being filmed on the Sierra Railroad, proposed to destroy her in a train wreck scene for the movie. The Sierra Railroad's Master Mechanic Bill Tremewan persuaded railroad management not to consider a notion so "ridiculous", and instead allowed shop crews to restore the locomotive to operation for charter and movie service. 

The rebuild was completed in 1948, and the locomotive officially returned to service heading a Pacific Coast Chapter, Railway and Locomotive Historical Society sponsored excursion train on May 30 that year. Over the next half-century, Sierra No. 3 pulled excursion trains and appeared in dozens of films, TV shows, and commercials. Among them were High Noon in 1952, for which Gary Cooper won the Academy Award for Best Actor, and Unforgiven, starring and directed by Clint Eastwood, which won the Academy Award for Best Picture for 1992.

The locomotive was often redecorated for various movie and television appearances, one of its most famous roles being the Hooterville Cannonball from the mid-1960s series Petticoat Junction. False smokestacks were also often installed to alter the appearance of the locomotive.

In 1979, Crocker and Associates announced their intention to sell the railroad to Silverfoot, Inc. based in Chicago, Illinois, but the deal did not include the historic steam era shop facilities in Jamestown.  The complex, including Sierra No. 3, was acquired by the State of California as a result of legislation passed in April 1981, and signed by Governor Jerry Brown.  The acquisition was completed on September 15, 1982, and since then, the locomotive has been the property of the State of California. In 1991, No. 3 turned 100 years old, and in May, it was moved to Sacramento to take part in "Railfair '91", an event that celebrated the tenth anniversary of the grand opening of the California State Railroad Museum.

In 1995, the Federal Railroad Administration issued new safety standards for steam locomotive boilers following the Gettysburg Railroad incident. In order to comply with these revised regulations, Sierra No. 3 was removed from service until a complete evaluation of the locomotive's condition could be made.

21st-century renovation

Preliminary repairs were completed in 2000–2001 with deferred maintenance funding from the State of California. This included dismantling the locomotive.  The project progressed very slowly until 2007, when a major fundraising campaign began.  At that time, the budget for the project was estimated at US$600,000, based on the assumption the existing boiler could be saved.

In a fundraising appeal, Clint Eastwood described Sierra No. 3 as "like a treasured old friend." Eastwood had ridden the locomotive early in his career on the TV series Rawhide, and later used the locomotive in his own movie productions Pale Rider and Unforgiven. Eastwood wrote, "Sierra No. 3 resides at Railtown 1897 State Historic Park. It is housed in the original roundhouse which is still in use. Together these two assets provide a rare opportunity to experience history just as it was 109 years ago."  Funding for the renovation project was provided by the California Cultural and Historical Endowment, the Irving J. Symons Foundation, the Sonora Area Foundation, the California State Parks Foundation, the Teichert Foundation, DuPont and many individual donors. 

The rebuild included boring out the cylinders and turning the drive wheel tires on a lathe.

When work on the disassembled locomotive resumed, and the boiler was inspected thoroughly by ultrasound testing, it was discovered that a new boiler was necessary. Its old lap seam design made retrofitting it to modern standards too costly, and the risk of the boiler losing its historical integrity was a risk Railtown staff decided not to take. Engineering drawings and other technical assistance needed to build a new boiler were provided by the Strasburg Rail Road in Lancaster County, Pennsylvania. The old boiler was shipped to the Chelatchie Boiler Works of Camas, Washington to be used as a reference. Chelatchie fabricated a new welded boiler for the No. 3 at a cost of US$600,000.  Following the completion of the new boiler, both boilers were shipped to the historic Southern Pacific shops in Sacramento, California and fitted on the original frame. The locomotive was then moved via truck back to Jamestown, California for final assembly.

The 1920s were selected as the restoration period for the locomotive to represent. The final cost of the restoration was US$1.6 million; the locomotive officially returned to service on July 3, 2010.

Movie appearances

Sierra No. 3 has appeared in many movies.
According to Movie Railroad Historian Larry Jensen, those which were filmed using Sierra No. 3 include the following:
The Terror, 1920, starring Tom Mix
The Virginian, 1929, starring Gary Cooper and Walter Huston.  This was the first talkie filmed on location rather than on a studio sound stage.
The Texan, 1930, starring Gary Cooper and Fay Wray
The Conquerors, 1932, starring Richard Dix and Ann Harding
Laughter in Hell, 1933, starring Pat O'Brien and Gloria Stuart
Wyoming Mail, 1950, starring Stephen McNally, Howard Da Silva and Ed Begley
Sierra Passage, 1950, starring Wayne Morris and Lola Albright
Drums in the Deep South, 1951, starring James Craig and Guy Madison
The Cimarron Kid, 1952, starring Audie Murphy and James Best
High Noon, 1952, starring Gary Cooper, Grace Kelly and Katy Jurado.
Kansas Pacific, 1953, starring Sterling Hayden and Eve Miller.
The Moonlighter, 1953, starring Barbara Stanwyck, Fred MacMurray, William Ching and Ward Bond.
Rage at Dawn, 1955, starring Randolph Scott and Forrest Tucker
The Return of Jack Slade, 1955, starring John Ericson, Neville Brand and Angie Dickinson
Texas Lady, 1955, starring Claudette Colbert and Barry Sullivan
The Big Land, 1957, starring Alan Ladd, Virginia Mayo and Edmond O'Brien
Man of the West, 1958, starring Gary Cooper, Julie London and Lee J. Cobb
Face of a Fugitive, 1959, starring Fred MacMurray, Dorothy Green and James Coburn
The Outrage, 1964, a remake of Rashomon as a western, starring Edward G. Robinson, Paul Newman, Laurence Harvey, Claire Bloom and William Shatner
The Great Race, 1965, starring Jack Lemmon, Tony Curtis and Natalie Wood
The Rare Breed, 1966, starring James Stewart, Maureen O'Hara and Brian Keith
The Perils of Pauline, 1967, starring Pat Boone and Terry-Thomas - Sierra Railroad train sequence cut from final film.
Finian's Rainbow, 1968, starring Fred Astaire and Petula Clark
A Man Called Gannon, 1968, starring Tony Franciosa and Michael Sarrazin
The Great Bank Robbery, 1969, starring Zero Mostel and Kim Novak.
Diamond Stud, 1970, starring Robert Hall and John Alderman.
Joe Hill, 1971, a biopic about the IWW activist Joe Hill, starring Thommy Berggren.  The film won the Jury Prize at the 1971 Cannes Film Festival.
The Great Northfield Minnesota Raid, 1972, starring Cliff Robertson and Robert Duvall
Oklahoma Crude, 1973, starring George C. Scott and Faye Dunaway
Bound for Glory, 1976, a biopic of Woody Guthrie, starring David Carradine and Randy Quaid.  This was the first major film to use the Steadicam, and Haskell Wexler won the Academy Award for Best Cinematography for the film, and the film also won another Academy Award.
Nickelodeon, 1976, starring Ryan O'Neal, Burt Reynolds and Tatum O'Neal
The Apple Dumpling Gang Rides Again, 1979, starring Tim Conway and Don Knotts
The Long Riders, 1980, starring teams of brothers including James Keach and Stacy Keach, David Carradine and Keith Carradine, and Dennis Quaid and Randy Quaid.
Blood Red, 1989, starring Eric Roberts, Giancarlo Giannini, Dennis Hopper and Julia Roberts in her movie debut
Back to the Future Part III, 1990, starring Michael J. Fox, Christopher Lloyd and Mary Steenburgen. In what is probably her most famous movie appearance, the engine appears in the scenes set in 1885, six years prior to the engine's actual construction, portraying Central Pacific Railroad No. 131.  While the Central Pacific did have 4-6-0's similar to No. 3 at the time the film was set, the real Central Pacific No. 131 was a 4-4-0.
Unforgiven, 1992, directed by Clint Eastwood, starring Eastwood and Gene Hackman and winner of the Academy Award for Best Picture, Academy Award for Best Director and two other Academy Awards
Bad Girls, 1994, starring Drew Barrymore, Andie MacDowell, Madeleine Stowe and Mary Stuart Masterson
Color of a Brisk and Leaping Day, 1996, starring Peter Alexander.

TV appearances
Sierra No. 3 has also appeared in many television shows.  According to Railtown 1897, these include the following:

The Lone Ranger, 1956, starring Clayton Moore and Jay Silverheels.
Tales of Wells Fargo, 1957, starring Dale Robertson and William Demarest
Casey Jones, 1958, starring Alan Hale Jr.
Rawhide, 1959–1966, starring Clint Eastwood and Eric Fleming.
Overland Trail, 1960, starring William Bendix and Doug McClure.
Lassie, 1961–1962, starring Jon Provost, June Lockhart and Hugh Reilly.
Death Valley Days, 1962–1965, starring Ronald Reagan.
The Raiders, 1963 TV movie, starring Brian Keith and Robert Culp.
Petticoat Junction, 1963–1970, starring Bea Benaderet, Edgar Buchanan and Linda Kaye Henning.  Sierra No. 3 pulled the Hooterville Cannonball passenger train.
Green Acres, 1965–1971, starring Eddie Albert and Eva Gabor.  Sierra No. 3 pulled the Hooterville Cannonball passenger train.
The Wild Wild West, 1964, starring Robert Conrad and Ross Martin.
The Big Valley, 1964–1966, starring Barbara Stanwyck.
The Legend of Jesse James, 1965–1966, starring Christopher Jones and Allen Case.
Scalplock, 1966 TV movie, starring Dale Robertson and Diana Hyland.
Iron Horse, 1966–1968, starring Dale Robertson & Gary Owens. #3 portrays Buffalo Pass, Scalplock, & Defiance Railroad #3.
Cimarron Strip, 1967, starring Stuart Whitman and Jill Townsend.
Dundee and the Culhane, 1967, starring John Mills.
The Man from U.N.C.L.E., 1967, starring Robert Vaughn and David McCallum.
Ballad of the Iron Horse, 1967 documentary by John H. Secondari.
Gunsmoke, 1971, starring James Arness, Amanda Blake and Milburn Stone.
’Alias Smith & Jones, 1971-1973, starring Pete Duel, Ben Murphy and Roger Davis.
Bonanza, 1972, starring Lorne Greene and Michael Landon.
The Great Man's Whiskers, 1972 TV movie, starring Dean Jones, Ann Sothern and Dennis Weaver, telling the story of why Abraham Lincoln grew his beard.
Inventing of America, 1975 documentary by James Burke and Raymond Burr.
Little House on the Prairie, 1975–1983, starring Michael Landon, Karen Grassle and Melissa Gilbert.
Law of the Land, 1976 TV movie starring James Davis and Don Johnson.
A Woman Called Moses, a 1978 biopic miniseries about Harriet Tubman, starring Cicely Tyson.
Lacy and the Mississippi Queen, 1978 TV movie, starring Kathleen Lloyd and Debra Feuer.
Kate Bliss and the Ticker Tape Kid, 1978 TV movie, starring Suzanne Pleshette.
The Night Rider, 1979 TV movie, starring David Selby, Pernell Roberts and Kim Cattrall.
The Last Ride of the Dalton Gang, 1979 TV movie, starring Randy Quaid, Cliff Potts and Larry Wilcox
Belle Starr, 1980 TV movie, starring Elizabeth Montgomery and Cliff Potts.
East of Eden, 1981 TV miniseries based on John Steinbeck's novel, starring Bruce Boxleitner, Lloyd Bridges, Warren Oates and Anne Baxter.
Father Murphy, 1981, starring Merlin Olsen, Katherine Cannon and Moses Gunn.
The A-Team, 1984, starring George Peppard and Mr. T.
Bonanza: The Next Generation, 1988 TV movie, starring Michael Landon, Jr. and John Ireland.
The Adventures of Brisco County, Jr., 1993, starring Bruce Campbell.
Ultimate Restorations Season 1, Episode 3, 10/20/2014.

See also

Sierra Railway 28, a 2-8-0 consolidation also owned by Railtown 1897
Dayton, also a vintage "Movie Star" 4-4-0
Inyo, another vintage 4-4-0 which has been featured on screen, including The Great Locomotive Chase and the television series Wild Wild West
William Mason, an 1856 B&O Railroad 4-4-0 which has starred in many films including The Great Locomotive Chase and Wild Wild West

References

Further reading

External links

Railtown 1897 State Historic Park: Sierra #3 Moves Under Own Power!
Los Angeles Times: Restored 'movie star locomotive' returns to tracks for Fourth of July
KCRA video: Movie Locomotive Restored To Old Glory

Preserved steam locomotives of California
California State Historic Parks
History of Tuolumne County, California
4-6-0 locomotives
Rogers locomotives
Individual locomotives of the United States
Clint Eastwood
Railway locomotives introduced in 1891
Standard gauge locomotives of the United States